Dunayevsky, Dunayevski, Dunayevskii, Dunaevsky, etc. is an East Slavic masculine surname, its feminine counterpart is Dunayevskaya or Dunayevskaia.  The surname derives from the Danube River, which is called Dunay in Russian.

The Polish-language equivalent is Dunajewski.

The surname may refer to
Isaak Dunayevsky (1900–1955), Soviet film composer and conductor
Maksim Dunayevsky (born 1945), Soviet film composer, son of Isaak
Raya Dunayevskaya (1910–1987), American Marxist 

East Slavic-language surnames